Wesley Polk Chamberlain (born April 13, 1966) is an American former professional baseball right fielder/left fielder. He played all or parts of six seasons in Major League Baseball (MLB), from 1990 through 1995, for the Philadelphia Phillies (1990–95) and Boston Red Sox (1995). He also played one season in Nippon Professional Baseball (NPB), for the Chiba Lotte Marines (1996).

Career
A 4th round pick in the 1987 draft, Chamberlain, who played high school baseball at Neal F. Simeon H.S. in Chicago, was signed by the Pittsburgh Pirates out of the Jackson State University. In 1990, he was sent by Pittsburgh to Philadelphia in the same transaction that brought Carmelo Martínez to the Pirates. His most productive season came in 1991 with the Phillies, when he posted career-highs in home runs (13), RBI (50), runs (51), hits (92), stolen bases (9) and games played (101), including three four-hit games. The effort earned him the 5th place in the NL Rookie of the Year Award vote. He also appeared in the 1993 World Series, won by the Toronto Blue Jays in six games. During the 1994 midseason, he was sent by Philadelphia to Boston in exchange for Paul Quantrill and Billy Hatcher.

In a six-season career, Chamberlain was a .255 hitter with 43 home runs and 167 RBI in 385 games. After that, he was signed by the Japan's Chiba Lotte Marines in 1996.

Following his major league career, Chamberlain played for a number of independent league teams, including the Gary SouthShore RailCats and Winnipeg Goldeyes of the Northern League, being selected an All-Star in 2000 and 2003.

External links

Wes Chamberlain at Pura Pelota (Venezuelan Professional Baseball League)
(In The Final 98–99 Wes Chamberlain connect gold hit they left him on the ground at the Leones del Caracas 3–4 In Barquisimeto The Champion of the Cardenales de Lara 98–99.)

1966 births
Living people
African-American baseball players
Albuquerque Dukes players
American expatriate baseball players in Canada
American expatriate baseball players in Japan
American expatriate baseball players in Mexico
Augusta Pirates players
Baseball players from Chicago
Boston Red Sox players
Buffalo Bisons (minor league) players
Cafeteros de Córdoba players
Calgary Cannons players
Cardenales de Lara players
American expatriate baseball players in Venezuela
Chiba Lotte Marines players
Clearwater Phillies players
Gary SouthShore RailCats players
Harrisburg Senators players
Jackson State Tigers baseball players
Long Island Ducks players
Major League Baseball left fielders
Major League Baseball right fielders
Newark Bears players
Nippon Professional Baseball first basemen
Norfolk Tides players
Oklahoma RedHawks players
Omaha Royals players
Pawtucket Red Sox players
Philadelphia Phillies players
Salem Buccaneers players
Schaumburg Flyers players
Scranton/Wilkes-Barre Red Barons players
Syracuse Chiefs players
Watertown Pirates players
Winnipeg Goldeyes players
21st-century African-American people
20th-century African-American sportspeople
Anchorage Glacier Pilots players